Kala, known professionally as Kala Master, is an Indian choreographer. She is the director of the Indian reality dance talent show, Maanada Mayilada – where she is one of the three judges. She was awarded the National Film Award for Best Choreography in 2000 for her folk dance sequences in the Malayalam film, Kochu Kochu Santhoshangal.

Career

A trained classical dancer, Kala, a school drop out, entered the film industry through the influence of her brother-in-law, the choreographer Raghuram. Making her debut as an assistant choreographer at the age of 12 in 1982, she got a break during the making of Punnagai Mannan in 1986 starring Kamal Haasan and Revathi, as director K. Balachander suggested Kala fill in for the busy Raghuram. She was then chosen again by Balachandar as the lead choreographer for Pudhu Pudhu Arthangal (1989).

She has since worked in over 4000 songs in various languages including Tamil, Telugu, Malayalam, Hindi, Kannada, Oriya, Bengali, English, Italian and Japanese. She has referred to the "Kozhi Koovum Neram achu" song in Azhagan as one of her leading pieces of work and also referred actress Bhanupriya as her favorite dancer. She was handed the opportunity to choreograph the Miss World 1996 Beauty Pageant held at Bangalore for which she received a special award of excellence. Moreover, she notes that a stage event in Malaysia featuring Prashanth and seven heroines, propelled her into fame. She was awarded the National Film Award for Best Choreography in 2000 for her folk dance sequences in the Malayalam film, Kochu Kochu Santhoshangal. She became the first to start a cinematic dance school named Kala's Kalalaya which has five branches in Chennai. She manages it along with her sisters. Kala's merit is in popularising a peculiar dance form, cobbled together with borrowings from classical, Indian folk, bhangra and western steps. She also won the Tamil Nadu State Film Award for Best Choreographer for her work in Chandramukhi.

She has since gone to specialise in directing dance reality shows, notably Maanada Mayilada, which has finished nine seasons. She is currently judging dance reality show Odi Vilayadu Papa in Kalaignar TV.

Selected filmography

Personal life

Kala was born into a family of seven girls and revealed that she was brought up in a one-room house during her childhood. An elder sister Jayanthi, first started dancing and acted as heroine in two films – Uthiripookkal and Poottatha Pookkal. Kala’s second sister Girija, learned Bharatanatyam at Kalakshetra; and went to work with choreographers Thangam and later Raghuram Master, whom she married later, and also become an independent choreographer. Kala was the sixth daughter, while Brinda, a leading choreographer, is her youngest sister.

One of her nephews, Prasanna Sujit, is also a film choreographer. One of her niece Master Gayathri Raghuram, daughter of late Raghuram Master and her sister Girija is also a choreographer and an actor. She has also introduced her another niece Keerthi, daughter of Jayanthi Master and wife of actor Shanthanu Baghyaraj, as an anchor in her dance reality show Manada Mayilada.

Kala was previously married to UAE based businessman, Govindarajan in 1997, who is the brother of actress Sneha. Kala had initially shifted to Dubai after her marriage but problems prompted her to return to Chennai and take up choreographing again. The pair got divorced in 1999, and soon after Kala and Brindha controversially made derogatory comments about Sneha's dancing ability to a magazine.

She married Mahesh in 2004. It was a love marriage. The couple has a son Vidyuth, born in 2007.

Television

References

External links
 

Indian film choreographers
Living people
Artists from Chennai
Indian women choreographers
Indian choreographers
Indian female dancers
1971 births
Dancers from Tamil Nadu
Women artists from Tamil Nadu
21st-century Indian women artists
21st-century Indian dancers
Best Choreography National Film Award winners